Mary Radcliffe may refer to:

 Mary Arundell (courtier) (died 1577), married name Radcliffe
 Mary Radcliffe (courtier) (1550-1617), Lady of the Bedchamber to Elizabeth I of England
 Lady Mary Tudor (1673–1726), illegitimate daughter of Charles II and wife of Edward Radclyffe, 2nd Earl of Derwentwater
 Mary Ann Radcliffe (1746–1818), British figure in the early feminist movement

See also
Radcliffe (disambiguation)